Archers Cay is an island in The Bahamas, near Water Cay. It is a part of Central Abaco province.

References

Islands of the Bahamas